Dawson Gascoigne Harron (12 September 1921 – 21 July 1988) was an English cricketer.  Harron was a right-handed batsman.  He was born at Langley Park, County Durham.

Harron made his debut for Durham in the 1947 Minor Counties Championship against Staffordshire.  He played Minor counties cricket for Durham from 1947 to 1949, making five Minor Counties Championship appearances.

Harron later joined Leicestershire, making his first-class debut for the county against Middlesex in the 1951 County Championship.  He made nine further first-class appearances in 1951, the last of which came against Yorkshire.  In his ten first-class matches, he scored a total of 186 runs at an average of 15.50, with a high score of 53.  This score, which was his only first-class fifty, came against Surrey.

He died at Coventry, Warwickshire on 21 July 1988.

References

External links
Dawson Harron at ESPNcricinfo
Dawson Harron at CricketArchive

1921 births
1988 deaths
People from Langley Park, County Durham
Cricketers from County Durham
English cricketers
Durham cricketers
Leicestershire cricketers